The Swedish grid (in Swedish Rikets Nät, RT 90) is the coordinate system used for government maps in Sweden. RT 90 is a slightly modified version of the RT 38 from 1938.

While the system could be used with negative numbers to represent all four "quarters" of the earth (NE, NW, SE, and SW hemispheres), the standard application of RT 90 is only useful for the northern half of the eastern hemisphere where numbers are positive. The coordinate system is based on metric measures rooting from the crossing of the Prime Meridian and the Equator at 0,0. The Central Meridian used to be based on a meridian located at the old observatory in Stockholm, but today it is based on the Prime Meridian at Greenwich. The numbering system's first digit represents the largest distance, followed by what can be seen as fractional decimal digits (though without an explicit decimal point). Therefore, X 65 is located halfway between X 6 and X 7.
The coordinate grid is specified using two numbers, named X and Y, X being the south–north axis and Y the west–east axis. Two seven-digit numbers are sufficient to specify a location with a one m resolution. 

Example:
X=6620000 Y=1317000 (X is the northing and Y is the easting) denotes a position 6620 km north of the Equator and -183 km (1317 km-1500 km) west of the Central Meridian, which happens to be somewhere near the town center of Arvika.

RT90 Map Projection Parameters

References 

Two-dimensional systems: RT 90 Lantmäteriet (Swedish Land Survey).

Geography of Sweden
Geographic coordinate systems